Sandro Jung (born 1976) is a literary scholar and Distinguished Professor of English Literature at the Shanghai University of Finance and Economics. In addition to his position at the Shanghai University of Finance and Economics, he also serves as Jack Ma Distinguished Professor at Hangzhou Normal University. Since 2020, He has also served as the Director of the Centre for the Study of Text and Print Culture at the Shanghai University of Finance and Economics.  
Jung is the Founding Director of the Centre for the Study of Text and Print Culture at Ghent University.
He is the editor-in-chief of ANQ: A Quarterly Journal of Short Articles, Notes and Reviews.
Jung is known for his works on English poetry. He has also published on literature and visual culture, and he is considered a leading authority in the field of illustration studies.

Books
Kleine artige Kupfer: Buchillustration im 18. Jahrhundert, Harrassowitz, 2018
The Publishing and Marketing of Illustrated Literature in Scotland, 1760-1825, Lehigh University Press, 2017
Thomson’s ‘The Seasons’, Print Culture, and Visual Interpretation, 1730-1842, Lehigh University Press, 2015
The Fragmentary Poetic: Eighteenth-Century Uses of an Experimental Mode, Lehigh University Press, 2009
David Mallet, Anglo-Scot: Poetry, Patronage and Politics in the Age of Union, University of Delaware Press, 2008

References

1976 births
Living people
Academic staff of Shanghai University of Finance and Economics
Alumni of the University of Wales, Lampeter
Welsh literary critics
Academic staff of Ghent University
Linguistics journal editors